Charles Anthony Fusina (born May 31, 1957) is a former American college and professional football player who was a quarterback in the National Football League (NFL) and United States Football League (USFL) for seven seasons during the 1970s and 1980s.  He played college football for Penn State University, and was recognized as an All-American.  Fusina played professionally for the Tampa Bay Buccaneers and Green Bay Packers of the NFL, and the Philadelphia/Baltimore Stars of the USFL.

Early years
Fusina was born in Pittsburgh, Pennsylvania.  He played quarterback for the Pittsburgh area Sto-Rox High School in McKees Rocks, Pennsylvania, where his old football jersey is on display outside of the gymnasium.

College career
Fusina capped an outstanding career at Penn State by winning the 1978 Maxwell Award, All-America honors, and was the runner-up in the Heisman Trophy balloting. He led the Nittany Lions to a  mark as a starter, including an 11–0 regular season in 1978. He passed for 1,859 yards and 11 touchdowns.

Fusina earned a Bachelor of Science in Marketing from Penn State in 1979. He also earned an MBA from La Salle University in 1988.

College statistics

* Includes bowl games.

Professional career
At 6'1" 195-lb., Fusina was a 5th round draft pick (#133 overall) of the Tampa Bay Buccaneers in the 1979 NFL Draft. He spent his first three professional seasons as back-up to Doug Williams. In 1983, he left for the fledgling USFL. Fusina signed with the Philadelphia/Baltimore Stars where he blossomed under coach Jim Mora. In his three seasons with the team, he passed for over 10,000 yards and led all USFL quarterbacks with 66 touchdowns and a QB rating of 88.6 and led the Stars to back-to-back USFL titles in 1984 and 1985. He was named MVP of the 1984 USFL Championship Game. When the league folded in August 1986, Fusina returned to the NFL for one season with the Green Bay Packers.

Personal life
Fusina has been an instructor at the Gus Purcell Quarterback School in Charlotte, North Carolina. He and his wife, Jacquelyn live in Pittsburgh Pennsylvania, and his children Matt and Shannon currently live in Washington, DC.

Hall of Fame
In 2015 Fusina was elected to the Pennsylvania Sports Hall of Fame (PSHF) along with his head coach Joe Paterno and teammate, kicker Matt Bahr.

References

External links
All-Time USFL Team
"Packers Sign Fusina" The New York Times, October 2, 1986.

1957 births
Living people
All-American college football players
American football quarterbacks
American people of Italian descent
Green Bay Packers players
Maxwell Award winners
Penn State Nittany Lions football players
People from McKees Rocks, Pennsylvania
Philadelphia/Baltimore Stars players
Players of American football from Pennsylvania
Sportspeople from Pennsylvania
Tampa Bay Buccaneers players